Givry may refer to :

Places
Belgium
 Givry, Hainaut, village in the municipality of Quévy, Hainaut province
 Givry, Luxembourg, village in the municipality of Bertogne, Luxembourg province

France
 Givry, Ardennes, in the Ardennes department
 Givry, Saône-et-Loire, in the Saône-et-Loire department
 Givry, Yonne, in the Yonne department
 Givry-en-Argonne, in the Marne department
 Givry-lès-Loisy, in the Marne department

People
 Edgar Givry (born 1953), French actor
 Anne d'Escars de Givry (1546–1612), French Benedictine churchman, supporter of the Catholic League of France, and cardinal
 Claude de Longwy de Givry (1481–1561), French bishop and cardinal

Other
 Givry wine, a Burgundy wine